Villain is the eighth studio album by American metalcore band Attila. The album was released on February 22, 2019. This is the first Attila album with new drummer Bryan McClure, after longtime drummer Sean Heenan left the band.

Track listing

Personnel
Chris "Fronz" Fronzak – vocals
Chris Linck – guitars
Kalan Blehm – bass
Bryan McClure – drums

Charts

References 

2019 albums
Attila (metalcore band) albums